
Gmina Ćmielów is an urban-rural gmina (administrative district) in Ostrowiec County, Świętokrzyskie Voivodeship, in south-central Poland.

Villages
Apart from the town of Ćmielów, Gmina Ćmielów contains the villages and settlements of Boria, Borownia, Brzóstowa, Buszkowice, Czarna Glina, Drzenkowice, Glinka, Grójec, Jastków, Krzczonowice, Łysowody, Piaski Brzóstowskie, Podgórze, Podgrodzie, Przeuszyn, Ruda Kościelna, Stare Stoki, Stoki Duże, Stoki Małe, Trębanów, Wiktoryn, Wojnowice, Wola Grójecka and Wólka Wojnowska.

Neighbouring gminas
Gmina Ćmielów is bordered by the gminas of Bałtów, Bodzechów, Opatów, Ożarów, Sadowie, Tarłów and Wojciechowice.

References
Polish official population figures 2006

Cmielow
Ostrowiec County